Lisanne de Witte (born 10 September 1992) is a Dutch sprinter who specialises in the 400 metres. She won bronze medals in this event at the 2018 European Championships and 2019 European Indoor Championships, and took several medals as part of the Dutch 4 × 400 m relays.

De Witte competed in the 2016 Summer Olympics in Rio de Janeiro on the Dutch 4 × 400 m relay team who ran a national record of 3:26.98. She also competed in the 400 metres event at the 2014 IAAF World Indoor Championships. She ran a personal best of 52.61 s in the series and came in third in the semifinals, but was excluded from the finals after the US team argued that she had impeded Joanna Atkins, who came in fourth behind her. At the 2018 European Championships she won the bronze medal.

Her younger sister, Laura de Witte, is also a 400 metres sprinter.

De Witte's personal best in the 400 metres is 50.77 seconds (Berlin 2018).

Competition record

Personal bests
 400 metres – 50.77 (Berlin 2018)
 400 metres indoor – 51.90 (Toruń 2020)
Relays
 4 × 400 metres relay – 3:20.87 (Munich 2022) 
 4 × 400 m relay indoor – 3:27.15 (Toruń 2021)

Notes

References

External links
 
 

1992 births
Living people
Dutch female sprinters
Dutch female middle-distance runners
People from Vlaardingen
Olympic athletes of the Netherlands
Athletes (track and field) at the 2016 Summer Olympics
Athletes (track and field) at the 2020 Summer Olympics
Dutch Athletics Championships winners
European Athletics Indoor Championships winners
Olympic female sprinters
World Athletics Indoor Championships medalists
Sportspeople from South Holland
European Athletics Championships winners
21st-century Dutch women